Acrocercops marmarauges is a moth of the family Gracillariidae, known from Java, Indonesia. It was described by Edward Meyrick in 1932.

References

marmarauges
Moths of Asia
Moths described in 1936